Durach is a municipality in the district of Oberallgäu in Bavaria in Germany.

The village came into international media attention in August 2008 when a light aircraft hit power lines in its vicinity and the pilot and passenger, who had survived inside the plane dangling on high-tension power cables, were rescued in front of cameras.

Footnotes

External links

Oberallgäu